Exchange Place is a modern skyscraper located at 43–53 State Street or 1 Exchange Place, between Congress and Kilby Streets, in the Financial District of Boston, Massachusetts.  Built in 1981–1985, it is Boston's 14th tallest building, standing 510 feet (155 m) tall, and containing 40 floors. It rises out of a previous building, the 12-story Boston Stock Exchange, built in 1889–1891 and designed by Peabody and Stearns.  The intent was to demolish the older building in order to construct the skyscraper, but preservationists succeeded in rescuing a portion of the Stock Exchange's facade.

Brookfield Office Properties, which had previously purchased the building from Harold Theran in 2006, sold Exchange Place to UBS Realty Investors LLC in 2011. It is home to the Boston Consulting Group, advertising agency Hill Holliday, marketing agency Optaros, software company Acquia, Hachette Book Group, the Macquarie Group, The Blackstone Group, and AllianceBernstein. In June 2017, The Boston Globe moved into Exchange Place from its longtime headquarters on Morrissey Boulevard in Dorchester, Boston.

The original Exchange Building was designated a Boston Landmark by the Boston Landmarks Commission in 1980.

See also
 List of tallest buildings in Boston

References

External links

 Exchange Place at Emporis.com

Brookfield Properties buildings
Office buildings completed in 1985
Skyscraper office buildings in Boston